Munduruku is a Tupi language spoken by 10,000 people in the Tapajós River basin in north central Brazil, of which most of the women and children are monolingual.

Gomes (2006) points out that Munduruku is one of the languages of the Tupian family and constitutes, together with Kuruaya, the Munduruku linguistic branch [...] The Portuguese language has made significant inroads among the Munduruku. Some loss of the Munduruku language is occurring among those who live in the area of the Madeira River and in the outskirts of the towns next to the Tapajós River; however, the situation is not as bad as it seems, as even here, the language of the majority of is Munduruku, and bilingualism only takes place after Munduruku has already been acquired (around 10 years of age), usually as a result of learning Portuguese at school.

Those who live in the villages of the Tapajós River valley speak only Munduruku, even in the presence of non-indigenous people. There are elementary schools located in almost all villages, and courses promoted by the Brazilian government have turned over education to the Mundurukú, who are starting to take control of their own formal education."

Phonology

Phoneme inventory

Consonants

Vowels

Syllable structure 
The syllable in Munduruku is made up of an obligatory vocalic nucleus and one of four phonemic accents (three of pitch and one of laryngealization). It may also have an onset or coda. No consonant clusters are permitted. Thus, the permissible syllables are CV, CVC, V, and VC (with V being the most rare).

Onset 

The onset in this language may be any one of the 16 consonant phonemes which contrast as to the manner and point of articulation: (1) voiceless stops /p, t, k, tʃ, k, ʔ/; (2) Voiced stops /b, dʒ/; (3) Fricatives /s, ʃ, h/, (4) nasals /m, n, ŋ/, (5) Sonorants /w, y, r/

Coda 
The only segment not allowed in the coda is /tʃ/. Observe that CVj and CVw and not CV.V ones are considered CVC syllables for a variety of reasons; one is that it would require positing a new syllable pattern limited to CVu and CVi with no other vowels occurring in coda position. There is also a phonetic contrast between /i, u/ as vowel nuclei and /y, w/ as codas, the former being distinctly vocalic and the latter consonantal.

Nucleus 
The syllabic nucleus is limited to only one vowel.

Accent 
Accent is considered a feature of the entire syllable rather than of the nucleus only. One accent occurs with each syllable. Note that the functional load of accent is light—only some 40 lexical pairs with contrastive accents have been found, and few grammatical contrasts are marked by accent alone.

Syntax 
Munduruku is an OV language.

See also
 Munduruku people

References

External links 
 
Mundurukú (Intercontinental Dictionary Series)
 TuLaR (Tupian Languages Resources)

Languages of Brazil
Indigenous languages of South America